The family Psittacidae or holotropical parrots is one of three families of true parrots. It comprises the roughly 10 species of subfamily Psittacinae (the Old World or Afrotropical parrots) and 157 of subfamily Arinae (the New World or Neotropical parrots), as well as several species that have gone extinct in recent centuries. Some of the most iconic birds in the world are represented here, such as the blue-and-gold macaw among the New World parrots and the grey parrot among the Old World parrots.

Distribution 
All of the parrot species in this family are found in tropical and subtropical zones and inhabit Mexico, Central and South America, the Caribbean islands, sub-Saharan Africa, the island of Madagascar, the Arabian Peninsula, Southeast Asia, Australia and Oceania. Two parrots, one extinct and the other extirpated, formerly inhabited the United States.

Evolutionary history 
This family probably had its origin early in the Paleogene period, 66–23 million years ago (Mya), after the western half of Gondwana had separated into the continents of Africa and South America, before the divergence of African and New World lineages around 30–35 Mya. The New World parrots, and by implication Old World parrots, last shared a common ancestor with the Australian parrots of the Cacatuidae an estimated 59 Mya.

The data place most of the diversification of psittaciformes around 40 Mya, after the separation of Australia from West Antarctica and South America.   Divergence of the Psittacidae from the ancestral parrots resulted from a common radiation event from what was then West Antarctica into South America, then Africa, via late Cretaceous land bridges that survived through the Paleogene.

Taxonomy 
The family Psittacidae was introduced (as Psittacea) by French polymath Constantine Samuel Rafinesque in 1815. The recently revised taxonomy of the family Psittacidae, based on molecular studies, recognizes the sister clade relationship of the Old World Psittacini and New World Arini tribes of subfamily Psittacinae, which have been raised to subfamily ranking and renamed Psittacinae and Arinae.  Subfamily Loriinae and the other tribes of subfamily Psittacinae are now placed in superfamily Psittacoidea of all true parrots, which includes family Psittacidae.

 Subfamily Psittacinae
 Genus Bavaripsitta†
 Genus Psittacus – African grey parrots (two species)
 Genus Poicephalus
 Subfamily Arinae
 Tribe Arini – macaws and parakeets
 Genus Anodorhynchus
 Genus Cyanopsitta
 Genus Ara
 Genus Orthopsittaca
 Genus Primolius
 Genus Diopsittaca
 Genus Rhynchopsitta
 Genus Ognorhynchus
 Genus Guaruba
 Genus Leptosittaca
 Genus Conuropsis†
 Genus Psittacara
 Genus Aratinga
 Genus Eupsittula
 Genus Thectocercus
 Genus Cyanoliseus
 Genus Pyrrhura
 Genus Enicognathus
 Tribe Androglossini – Amazon and related parrots
 Genus Pyrilia
 Genus Pionopsitta
 Genus Graydidascalus
 Genus Alipiopsitta
 Genus Pionus
 Genus Amazona
 Genus Triclaria
 Clade (proposed tribe Amoropsittacini)
 Genus Nannopsittaca
 Genus Psilopsiagon
 Genus Bolborhynchus
 Genus Touit
 Clade (proposed tribe Forpini) – parrotlets
 Genus Forpus
 Clade including Arini
 Genus Pionites – caiques (four species)
 Genus Deroptyus – red-fan parrot
 Clade including Androglossini
 Genus Hapalopsittaca
 Genus Brotogeris
 Genus Myiopsitta

References 

Parrots
Taxa described in 1815
Taxa named by Constantine Samuel Rafinesque